Robert Mayo (1916–2003) was a director of the United States' Office of Management and Budget in 1969-70

Robert or Bob Mayo may also refer to:
Robert Murphy Mayo (1836–1896), U.S. Representative from Virginia
Bob Mayo (1951–2004), American musician
Robert N. Mayo (1959-), Computer Science researcher in industry, and professor at the University of Wisconsin (1988)